The National Basketball League Fans MVP is an annual National Basketball League (NBL) award given since the 2015–16 NBL season to the best performing player of the regular season, with fans deciding on who receives the award. Bryce Cotton, Jerome Randle and Kai Sotto have all won the award twice.

Winners

References

Fans MVP
Awards established in 2016
2016 establishments in Australia